Thoracica is an infraclass of crustaceans which contains the most familiar species of barnacles found on rocky coasts, such as Semibalanus balanoides and Chthamalus stellatus. They have six well-developed limbs, and may be either stalked or sessile. The carapace is heavily calcified. The group includes free-living and commensal species.

Classification
This article follows Chan et al. (2021) and WoRMS in placing Thoracica as an infraclass of Thecostraca and in the following classification of thoracicans down to the level of family:

 Infraclass Thoracica Darwin, 1854
 Superorder Phosphatothoracica Gale, 2019
 Order Iblomorpha Buckeridge & Newman, 2006
 Family Iblidae Leach, 1825
 Family Idioiblidae Buckeridge & Newman, 2006
 Order †Eolepadomorpha Chan et al., 2021
 Family †Eolepadidae Buckeridge, 1983
 Family †Praelepadidae Chernyshev, 1930
 Superorder Thoracicalcarea Gale, 2015
 Order Balanomorpha Pilsbry, 1916
 Superfamily Balanoidea Leach, 1817
 Family Balanidae Leach, 1817
 Family Pyrgomatidae Gray, 1825
 Superfamily Chthamaloidea Darwin, 1854
 Family Catophragmidae Utinomi, 1968
 Family Chionelasmatidae Buckeridge, 1983
 Family Chthamalidae Darwin, 1854
 Family Pachylasmatidae Utinomi, 1968
 Family Waikalasmatidae Ross & Newman, 2001
 Superfamily Coronuloidea Leach, 1817
 Family Austrobalanidae Newman & Ross, 1976
 Family Bathylasmatidae Newman & Ross, 1971
 Family Chelonibiidae Pilsbry, 1916
 Family Coronulidae Leach, 1817
 Family Tetraclitidae Gruvel, 1903
 Superfamily Elminioidea Chan et al., 2021
 Family Elminiidae Foster, 1982
 Superfamily †Pachydiadematoidea Chan et al., 2021
 Family †Pachydiadematidae Chan et al., 2021
 Order Calanticomorpha Chan et al., 2021
 Family Calanticidae Zevina, 1978
 Family †Cretiscalpellidae Buckeridge, 1983
 Family †Titanolepadidae Gale & Sørensen, 2015
 Order Pollicipedomorpha Chan et al., 2021
 Family Lithotryidae Gruvel, 1905
 Family Pollicipedidae Leach, 1817
 Family †Zeugmatolepadidae Newman, 1996
 Order Scalpellomorpha Buckeridge & Newman, 2006
 Superfamily Lepadoidea Chan et al., 2021
 Family Heteralepadidae Nilsson-Cantell, 1921
 Family Lepadidae Darwin, 1852
 Family Malacolepadidae Hiro, 1937
 Family Poecilasmatidae Annandale, 1909
 Family Rhizolepadidae Zevina, 1980
 Superfamily Neolepadoidea Chan et al., 2021
 Family Neobrachylepadidae Newman & Yamaguchi, 1995
 Family Neolepadidae Yamaguchi, Newman & Hashimoto, 2004
 Family Neoverrucidae Newman, 1989 in Hessler & Newman, 1989
 Family Probathylepadidae Ren & Sha, 2015
 Superfamily Scalpelloidea Chan et al., 2021
 Family Scalpellidae Pilsbry, 1907
 Family †Proverrucidae Newman, 1989 in Hessler & Newman, 1989
 Order Verrucomorpha Pilsbry, 1916
 Family Verrucidae Darwin, 1854
 Family †Eoverrucidae Gale, 2020
 Order †Archaeolepadomorpha Chan et al., 2021
 Family †Archaeolepadidae Gale, 2019
 Family †Myolepadidae Gale, 2015 in Gale & Sørensen, 2015
 Family †Stramentidae Withers, 1920
 Order †Brachylepadomorpha Withers, 1923
 Family †Brachylepadidae Woodward, 1901

References

Barnacles
Arthropod superorders